Tomasz Wacek  (born 30 August 1976 in Rymanów) is a Polish football manager and former defender who currently manages Polish side Glinik Gorlice.

External links
 

1977 births
Living people
Polish footballers
People from Rymanów
Sportspeople from Podkarpackie Voivodeship
Association football defenders
Karpaty Krosno players
MKS Cracovia (football) players
Górnik Wieliczka players
Karpaty Krosno managers